"Bad Magick" is a song by American rock band Godsmack, released in February 2001. It is featured on their second studio album, Awake, and is the only single by the band that's not included in their compilation album Good Times, Bad Times... Ten Years of Godsmack (2007).

Music video
Godsmack started working on the video with director Troy Smith in Portland, Maine, on September 10, 2001 and planned to finish the outdoor shots the next day and the arena shots at a concert, but the events of September 11 put a halt to the band's plans. The video was set to feature the band playing at a cookout in front of a handful of apathetic crowd members and one Godsmack fanatic, who tries to rally the rest of the audience. As the enthused fan watches the performance, he imagines the band performing in huge arenas. The live performance segments were delayed when the band's shows were cancelled after September 11.

Trivia
The song is featured in the 2002 compilation Wired-up.

Chart positions 

Singles  U.S. Billboard

Personnel
 Sully Erna – vocals, rhythm guitar, drums, producer
 Tony Rombola – lead guitars, additional vocals
 Robbie Merrill – bass
 Mudrock – producer

References

2001 singles
Godsmack songs
Songs about drugs
2000 songs
Songs written by Sully Erna
Republic Records singles